Monte Raci is a mountain reaching 610 metres located in the Sicilian province of Ragusa and is one of the Hyblaen chain. It is located in the Chiaramonte Gulfi commune.
Due to its rounded shape Monte Raci has been the subject of many photographers and advertising material.

References

Raci
Province of Ragusa